Eugenio Lascorz y Labastida (26 March 1886 – 1 June 1962) was a Spanish lawyer who claimed to be a descendant of the medieval Laskaris family (believing his last name Lascorz to be a corruption of Laskaris), which had ruled the Byzantine Empire in Nicaea from 1204 to 1261. In 1917, he changed his legal name to Eugenio Láscaris-Comneno (typically shortened to Eugenio Láscaris). As the supposed titular Emperor of Constantinople, Eugenio used the regnal name Eugene II Lascaris Comnenus. In addition to his royal and imperial claims, which he supported by creating invented and fabricated genealogies, Lascorz also claimed the titles "Prince Porphyrogenitus", Duke of Athens and Grand Master of the Constantinian Order of Saint George and a self-proclaimed order, the "Order of Saint Eugene of Trebizond".

Though he practised law, Lascorz was also interested in history, especially that of Ancient Greece and Byzantium, and published several books, both fiction and non-fiction, exploring what he perceived to be the history of his ancestors. His life's work was his attempt to have his claims recognised and his desire to claim the throne of the Kingdom of Greece and restore the Byzantine Empire.

Despite being exposed as a forger in the Spanish media in 1953, Lascorz maintained his claims until his death in 1962. His claim to descend from the Laskaris dynasty was continued by his son Teodoro ("Theodore IX Lascaris Comnenus", 1921–2006) and grandson Eugenio ("Eugene III Lascaris Comnenus", born 1975).

Biography

Ancestry and early life 
Eugenio Lascorz y Labastida was born in Zaragoza on 26 March 1886 and as per Spanish naming customs, took the surnames of both of his parents, Manuel Lascorz y Serveto (born in 1849) and Carmen Labastida y Paschal (born in 1857). He was baptised two days after his birth in the parish church of Nuestra Señora del Pilar (meaning "Our Lady of the Pillar"). His paternal grandparents were the labourer Victorián Lascorz y Abad and Raimunda Serveto; his maternal grandparents were Manuel Labastida and Ramona Paschal. His great-grandfather (Victorián's father) was a man named Alonso Lascorz y Cerdan. The Lascorz family, and Eugenio's other ancestors, were of Basque—not Greek—origin and were likely part of an influx of migrants who had arrived in Zaragoza in the third quarter of the 19th century.

The Lascorz family was wealthy. Eugenio's father, Manuel, had studied law and the Latin language and was an important man in Zaragoza, working as the secretary of the local provincial council. Manuel and Carmen had three children, Eugenio being the youngest. He had an older brother, Lorenzo (1877–1900), and sister Josefina (1881–1956). Both Eugenio and Lorenzo studied at the University of Zaragoza. Lorenzo studied medicine while Eugenio studied law. While studying at university, Eugenio discovered and became fascinated by Byzantine history. Lorenzo died in 1900 at the age of 22, making Eugenio the "heir" to Manuel. Eugenio began his professional career as an attorney in 1917. Exactly when Lascorz began his Byzantine claims is unclear. Later family tradition is that his father "revealed" their family history on his deathbed on 5 August 1906, declaring to Eugenio and Josefina that he was not just Manuel Lascorz y Serveto, but Prince Alexios Manuel Lascáris-Comneno, who had arrived with his father Prince Andronikos in Spain after fleeing from Ottoman persecution. Manuel's obituaries stated that he was a "descendant and heir of the ancient Greek imperial family of the same surname, fleeing from the ruins of his homeland".

Byzantine claims and aspirations

Attempt at gaining the throne of Greece 
Lascorz, possibly inspired by his father, believed that his last name was a corruption of Laskaris, the name of a medieval Greek dynasty which had ruled the Byzantine Empire in Nicaea from 1204 to 1261. Explicitly proclaiming his desire to restore the ancient glory of the Byzantine Empire, Lascorz was a proponent of the Greek Megali Idea—the Greek aspirations of conquering former Byzantine territory, including Constantinople, and restoring the borders of Byzantium. He embarked on a campaign attempting to secure recognition of his royal descent by changing his legal identity substituting "Lascorz" for "Láscaris" and seeking approval in Spanish courts. Lascorz believed his descent from the Laskarids could grant him a claim to the throne of the Kingdom of Greece, an idea which he dedicated the rest of his life to. Instead of Eugenio Lascorz, his new legal name was Eugenio Láscaris-Comneno (often shortened to Eugenio Láscaris). At the time, Greece was embroiled in a succession crisis; social tension and the abdication of King Constantine I put the future of the ruling House of Glücksburg in doubt.

In 1923, Lascorz issued a manifesto to the Greek people, proclaiming himself "Prince Eugene Lascaris Comnenus, heir to the Emperors of Byzantium and Pretender to the Throne of Greece". Lascorz believed that his supposed Byzantine ancestry went well with Greek dreams of past glories such as the Megali Idea. The Greek monarchy was abolished in 1924 in favour of the Second Hellenic Republic. The abdication of George II of Greece saw the momentary end of the rule of the House of Glücksburg over Greece. Lascorz took advantage of this interregnum to try to push his claim to the Greek throne, writing to various influential Greek figures. According to Lascorz, he had already received the blessing of the Patriarch of Constantinople, Meletius IV, in 1922, and in 1927 Lascorz and his oldest son Teodoro were supposedly granted some honours by the Greek Orthodox Patriarch of Jerusalem, Damian I. The Láscaris family archives contain documents which they claim were sent in the early 1920s by Eleftherios Venizelos, the former prime minister of Greece, during his self-exile in Paris, supposedly seriously considering Lascorz as a candidate for the Greek throne. According to contemporary newspapers and radio broadcasts in Spain, several Greek deputies had expressed interest in offering the Greek crown to Lascorz. That nothing came of Lascorz's candidacy for the Greek throne, even after Venizelos became prime minister again in 1928, is explained away by Lascorz' modern descendants as being due to economic crisis and political instability plaguing the country and any potential plans for making Lascorz king being forgotten.

Genealogical forgeries 
In 1935, Lascorz invented an elaborate genealogy, which notably altered his own familial history. His grandfather Victoriano was substituted by "Prince Andronikos Theodore Laskaris", supposedly described by his father on his deathbed. Eugenio's paternal great-grandfather, Alonso, was substituted by a "Prince Theodore Laskaris, Porphyrogenitus". In the 1940s and 1950s, Lascorz undertook a series of efforts to strengthen his imperial claim. In 1946, he attempted to expand his "Sovereign and Imperial Order of Constantine the Great" and his own order of Saint Helena into international organisations. In 1948, Lascorz began publishing his own magazine, Parthenon, with the Asociación Cultural Greco-Española (the Greco-Spanish Cultural Association, an organization based in Madrid) and on 15 September 1950 he founded the International Philo Byzantine Academy and University (IPHBAU), a "cultural extension" of his self-proclaimed chivalric orders, which also had its own magazine.

Later genealogies in 1947 and 1952, which again changed the names of Eugenio's ancestors, added more supposed "princes" and altered their relationships, contradicting his first genealogy. The 1952 version of the genealogy, the first to refer to Eugenio's father as "Alexios Manuel", explicitly contradicts Eugenio's earlier versions, which he had attempted to get approved by Spanish courts. Lascorz obtained "recognition" by several courts in Italy. These courts did not investigate his claims, nor did they have the competence or authority to proclaim someone as a claimant to the throne of the Byzantine Empire or the Kingdom of Greece. Lascorz married a woman named Nicasia Justa Micolau y Traver Blasco y Margell and had several children. Each received names of ancient Byzantine royalty, such as Teodoro, Constantino, Alejandro and Juan Arcadio.

Lascorz made no intellectual contributions to the legal world during his years as an attorney and lawyer. He spent his working years doing practical tasks and working. During the regime of Spanish dictator Francisco Franco, Lascorz served as a military judge. A resolute supporter of the regime, Lascorz, his wife, and his son, Teodoro, wrote to Franco several times. Franco's office responded, addressing Lascorz and his family with their self-proclaimed titles.

Lascorz was devoted to studying Ancient Greece and Byzantium, however, and wrote several books on Greek history. His Byzantine publications were not limited to historical works. As soon as he had moved to Madrid in 1943, Lascorz published the work Calígrafia grieca y byzantina (Greek and Byzantine Calligraphy), a collection of calligraphy exercises, beginning with tracing and then moving to reproductions of real ancient Greek and Byzantine initials, manuscripts and signatures. In 1956, Lascorz published "Caliniki: Evocación histórica", a short story centering on a fictional Lacaedaemonian girl named Cali Cabasileas from the time of the emperor Manuel Cantacuzeno, who falls in love with Andrónico, a courtier of the emperor.

The Hidalguía controversy 
There were many in Spain who supported Lascorz's dynastic claims. Among his most notable supporters was Norberto de Castro y Tosi, a Costa Rican professor and friend who published a biography of him in 1989, titled Eugenio II, un príncipe de Byzancio ("Eugene II, a Prince of Byzantium"). Castro's biography was very favourable to Lascorz, leaving out many episodes which might have caused controversy, such as his support of Franco.

In 1953 and 1954, Lascorz and his family, now prominent socialites in Madrid, were the focus of the "Hidalguía controversy", appearing in a series of articles in Spanish magazines, including one called "Hidalguía", which publicly identified him as a forger. This led to them being socially stigmatised. The controversy had its roots in a campaign begun by the Holy See in 1952 against what the Papacy regarded as fraudulent orders of chivalry. This campaign had become highly publicised in the Spanish media by 1953 when negotiations between the Papacy and the Spanish government—the Concordat of 1953—were approaching an end. Since Lascorz was at the head of several orders and organizations seen by the Vatican as false orders, he repeatedly aroused misgivings in the Spanish government and authorities. It is unlikely Lascorz would have attracted enough attention to be exposed had he not publicly promoted his order in Madrid. He gave out numerous noble titles to his friends and supporters attracting the attention of the authorities and the real Spanish nobility. On 23 April 1953, an article in the ABC newspaper, "Falsas órdenes de caballería y falsos títulos nobiliarios" ("False chivalric orders and false titles of nobility"), identified Lascorz as a forger and his orders and institutions as fake, stating that Lascorz violated "not only the principles of Church law, but also the sovereignty of the Spanish state". In later issues the newspaper also published and rebuked Lascorz's responses to the article, pointing out that the Spanish government had not approved his orders.

More damaging than the ABC articles were articles published early in 1954 in Hidalguía which denounced and debunked Lascorz's claims, sometimes in a somewhat humorous tone. The author of these articles, José María Palacio, wrote that Lascorz had used his knowledge of the legal system and the complicity or ignorance of certain key people to carry out legal deceptions and falsifications to transform his identity and insert himself as a descendant of the Laskaris dynasty. Furthermore, Palacio suggested correctly that the end goal of this plan was to gain the throne of Greece. On 13 March that same year, the Lascorz family responded through an interview with Teodoro (Eugenio's oldest son and family spokesman because of Eugenio's advanced age) in the daily newspaper in Madrid, in which he claimed that Palacio was an "old enemy" of the family and was actively attempting to "persecute" them. Throughout the rest of the 1950s, any references to Lascorz and his family were split between supporting, or more commonly, opposing them.

Final years and death 
Despite the negative press, Lascorz continued to push his claims. On 29 October 1955, he issued a proclamation to the people of Cyprus, then a British crown colony and not yet an independent country, in the hopes that they would liberate themselves and proclaim him as their monarch. In the proclamation, Lascorz stressed his supposed descent from "Prince Andronikos Theodoros Laskaris", "hero of the Greek War of Independence", and he ended the text with "Long live Greece! Long live Cyprus! Long live the Megali Idea, neither dead nor forgotten!". The proclamation received little attention in Cyprus.

In 1961, a court in Zaragoza ruled that Lascorz's change in name to Láscaris had been illegitimate and legally reverted his surname to the surname he had at birth, Lascorz y Labastida. The reasons for the decision are unclear, though it might stem from the earlier period of controversy. Lascorz died in Madrid on 1 June 1962. His death garnered some media attention, for instance being reported in the 26 July issue of the Colombian newspaper Diario de Boyacá and in the 15 August issue of the French newspaper Lyon-Information (also known as Independance), there under the article title "L'Hellénisme en deuil: Son Altesse Impériale et Régent le Prince Flavius Eugène II Láscaris Comnène" ("Hellenism in mourning: His Imperial and Royal Highness Prince Flavius Eugene II Lascaris Comnenus").

Legacy 
Lascorz' children continued to maintain his claims and his self-proclaimed chivalric orders. His descendants, the Láscaris or Láscaris-Comneno family, survive to this day. Many of his children left Spain, having become exhausted by the controversies in which the family became embroiled. His heir as "titular emperor" was his oldest son, Teodoro Láscaris-Comneno ("Theodore IX", 27 October 1921 – 20 September 2006), who moved across the Atlantic together with Eugenio's other male children, Juan Arcadio and Constantino. Teodoro, Juan Arcadio and Constantino worked as teachers in Latin America, teaching at universities in Costa Rica, Venezuela and Colombia. Teodoro propagated the idea that the Americas represent "New Byzantium" and the "Fourth Rome"; where Christian faith, Western thought, and Greek civilization would continue to survive. The younger son Constantino, who died in 1979, enjoyed a noteworthy academic career as a philosopher in Costa Rica.

Teodoro's son Eugenio (born on 10 October 1975), or Eugene III Theodore Emmanuel Lascaris Comnenus, maintains his family's claims. To this day, supporters of the family maintain Lascorz was legitimate, and that he was a restorer of traditional Byzantine institutions.

See also 

 Succession to the Byzantine Empire

Notes

References

Citations

Bibliography

Web sources 

1886 births
1962 deaths
Impostor pretenders
People from Zaragoza
Byzantine pretenders after 1453